Atatürk Forest Farm and Zoo (in short AOÇ) is an expansive recreational farming area, which houses a zoo, several small agricultural farms, greenhouses, restaurants, a dairy farm and a brewery in Ankara, Turkey. The farm and the zoo are under the administration of the Ministry of Agriculture and Village Affairs.

Forest farm

The Forest Farm was established in 1925 by Mustafa Kemal Atatürk, the first President of the Turkish Republic as a private farm. After 1926, the management of the farm was offered to Spiritual Christians from Russia living in north Kars Province who were noted for animal breeding (Malakan horse, Malakan cow) but who refused repatriation to Soviet Union. They declined to move to Ankara, because the most zealous believed they must live close to Mount Ararat for the Second Coming of Christ. In 1937, Atatürk donated the farm to the Turkish state. At the farm is an exact replica of the house, where Atatürk was born in 1881 in Selânik, Ottoman Empire.

Visitors to the farm can sample the products of the farm such as old-fashioned beer, fresh dairy products, ice cream, and meat rolls and kebabs made on charcoal, at a traditional restaurant (Merkez Lokantası, Central Restaurant) and other areas of catering around the farm.

Zoo
The Ankara Zoo is a  zoological garden founded in 1933. It houses some big cats, various birds, monkeys, apes, ungulates, snakes, and an aquarium. The zoo also breeds and sells Angora cats.

Recent controversies and disputes 
The current Presidential Complex of Turkey has been constructed on the part of the territory of the forest farm and this issue has involved substantial legal and political disputes in Turkey. According to the most recent reports, Turkey's Public Housing Development Administration (TOKI) is planning to sell farm land of the farm in an auction.

References

External links

Official Website of the park 
Official Website of Ankara Zoo 

Parks in Ankara
Farms in Turkey
Zoos in Turkey
Buildings and structures in Ankara
Tourist attractions in Ankara
Forest farm
Yenimahalle, Ankara
Urban public parks
Zoos established in 1933
1933 establishments in Turkey
1925 establishments in Turkey
Forest Farm and Zoo